Caenides kangvensis, the yellow-spotted recluse, is a species of butterfly in the family Hesperiidae. It is found in Ivory Coast, Ghana, Nigeria, Cameroon, Gabon, the Republic of the Congo, the Democratic Republic of the Congo, Uganda and north-western Tanzania. The habitat consists of forests and mature secondary growth.

The larvae feed on Thalia welwitschii and Gloriosa superba.

References

Butterflies described in 1896
Hesperiinae
Butterflies of Africa